Poetry Ireland Review is a journal of Irish poetry published three times a year by Poetry Ireland, the national Irish poetry organisation.

Poetry Ireland Review publishes the work of both emerging and established Irish and international poets. In line with keeping the journal fresh, vibrant and progressive it usually appoints a new editor for every four journals. An original Poetry Ireland journal appeared in April 1948, edited by David Marcus. It reappeared in Autumn 1962, published by Dolmen Press and edited by John Jordan with an editorial board of James Liddy, James J. McAuley and Richard Weber.

Poetry Ireland Review in its current format appeared in 1981, edited by John Jordan and is administrated by Poetry Ireland.

See also
List of literary magazines

References

Further information 
 ‘The Reception of Contemporary Scottish Poetry in Ireland: The Case of Poetry Ireland Review’, by Val Nolan, in The Enclave of My Nation: Cross-currents in Irish and Scottish Studies, eds. Shane Alcobia-Murphy and Margret Maxwell (Aberdeen: AHRC Centre for Irish and Scottish Studies, 2008). 

Literary magazines published in Ireland
Magazines established in 1948
Poetry literary magazines
Triannual magazines